Planica7 is a four-day tournament in ski flying at Letalnica bratov Gorišek in Planica, Slovenia. It is organized as part of the FIS World Cup.

Competition

Prize money 
The competition will have prize money 20,000 CHF for the overall winner.

Format 
The competition will last for four days in a row, with no break and 4 events with total of 7 rounds from individual events, team event and qualification round:

Host

Map

Hill record

Edition

References 

 
FIS Ski Jumping World Cup
Ski jumping competitions in Slovenia
International sports competitions hosted by Slovenia
Recurring sporting events established in 2018
2018 establishments in Slovenia